The 2012–13 VMI Keydets basketball team represented the Virginia Military Institute in the 2012–13 NCAA Division I men's basketball season. The Keydets were coached by Duggar Baucom, in his 8th year. They played their home games at the 5,800 seat Cameron Hall. They were a member of the North Division of the Big South Conference. They finished the season 14–17, 8–8 in Big South play to finish in second place in the North Division. They advanced to the semifinals of the Big South tournament where they fell to Charleston Southern.

Roster

Schedule

|-
!colspan=9| Exhibition

|-
!colspan=9| Regular season

|-
!colspan=9| 2013 Big South Conference men's basketball tournament

References

VMI Keydets basketball seasons
VMI
VMI Keydets bask
VMI Keydets bask